Dora is a 2017 Indian Tamil-language supernatural thriller film directed by Doss Ramasamy and produced by A. Sarkunam. It stars Nayanthara along with Thambi Ramaiah, Harish Uthaman and Sulile Kumar. The film's production began in March 2016 and principal photography commenced in June 2016, with Dinesh B. Krishnan working as the cinematographer. The film was released on 31 March 2017. Critical reception negative reviews for critics

Plot 

 
The film opens with Pavalakkodi in the hospital and her father Vairakannu weeping for her misfortune. Later, the scene cuts to their futures.

They live in a small house. Vairakannu is a single hardworking father who brought her up and Pavalakkodi, his only daughter, takes care of him in his old age and doesn't wish to marry. They lead a happy life. Nearby in an apartment, three thieves enter a house and rob all the jewels from the lady (Gayatri Rema), harass and kill her. To investigate this case, ACP Harish arrives at the site and finds no clue about the men and finds a Rajasthani blanket in the house. Upon asking, the house owner and maids say nothing, and therefore the case leads to nothing.

The story moves to Vairakannu, who wishes to go to the Kuladevi temple in their town for which they ask Pavalakkodi's aunt for a car to go there. Her aunt refuses to give them a car and her husband tries to hit Vairakannu for which Pavalakkodi speaks up. She says they both got the position they are in from her father's sacrifice. She adds due to her father's ambassador car, now they are able to run a call taxi business with 20-30 cars and scolds for showing no gratitude. She challenges them that one day she too will open her start up call taxi and reach great heights. Back home, Vairakannu and Pavalakkodi gather money that they have saved in their household objects and go to buy a car. They see several models but fall for a vintage car with no. MDS 13 which looks awkward to the viewers. The night after buying the car Pavalakkodi wakes up hearing strange noises and goes to have a look at the car. She finds a scared cat and it instantly flees upon seeing her. In the morning Vairakannu is fooled by a customer and is kept waiting. In the early night, he is taken to a graveyard and left alone there where the car stops at once. Vairakannu returns home and worries for his daughter because if he dies, who would support her? She then says that she would agree to marry a man who would stay at their house and take care of her father.

Suddenly the phone rings and it is revealed that Pavalakkodi's got a marriage proposal from Harish. His parents like the girl but Harish refuses to marry her. Pavalakkodi, in rage, challenges him that she would remain a virgin if he gets a girl who is more beautiful than her.

Later Pavalakkodi gets an order for a Tirupati trip for 20 days. This time she hires a driver who replaces the father and goes with the family to the trip. It is revealed that the guy who sold some bed sheets nearby on the day of the incident is the real culprit and Harish tries to catch him. It is shown that in the trip where the call taxi is going, the culprit also goes. Suddenly the driver loses control of the car and the cars itself moves towards the criminal. The driver and the family get worried about the car's supernatural ability and ring up Pavalakkodi. She reaches the site and takes her car back. On her way, she too encounters the supernatural ability of the car and the car kills the victim and showcases the shadow of a dog. She then flees from the accident spot but the car follows her. To her surprise, the car parks itself in her backyard and cleans the blood marks by itself with the wipers on. Upon asking a sorceress, she understands that the car is possessed by a dog's ghost which tries to communicate with Pavalakkodi. Upon asking, the dog car takes her to the real owner, an old man in a villa. He narrates to her how his granddaughter was connected to a dog called Dora. His granddaughter was an orphan who picked up a roadside dog and named it Dora. She loved Dora a lot. When the girl was out with her grandfather, the same three men attacked them and snatched away all the gold. They raped and killed the girl and also hit Pavalakkodi who tried to save them which resulted in a blood clot in Pavalakkodi's heart. It is revealed that the young girl was the one who donated her heart to Pavalakkodi, then died. But Dora after death possessed the car and believes that the girl lives on as Pavalakkodi and punishes the criminals in front of her. Pavalakkodi too takes revenge for the girl but she rifts with Harish in the case. She finally manages to kill two others with the help of Dora, saves her father from Mukesh Yadav, who was the main culprit behind the girl's murder. Pavalakkodi and Dora drive to Mukesh's hideout. Mukesh and Pavalakkodi fight but Pavalakkodi gets badly injured and Mukesh damages the car, which causes Dora to get injured. With the blessings of the Hindu god Bhairava, Dora manages to kill Mukesh before Pavalakkodi gets raped. Pavalakkodi and Dora drive back home with all the 3 criminals killed and finally avenged the girl's murder.

Cast
Nayanthara as Pavalakkodi 
Thambi Ramaiah as Vairakannu (Pavalakkodi's father)
Harish Uthaman as ACP A. Harish
Sulile Kumar as Mukesh Yadav 
Shan as Pawan Sharma 
Baby Yuktha as Aarthi Durga
Saravana Sakthi as Ghost

Production
In December 2015, A. Sarkunam announced that he would produce a horror film starring Nayanthara, which would be directed by his former assistant Dass Ramasamy. The film began production during March 2016, with scenes involving Nayanthara and Harish Uthaman being shot across Chennai. Thereafter, Thambi Ramaiah was signed to play Nayanthara's father in the film.

The film began production untitled and briefly developed under the title of Tik Tik Tik, before being titled Dora in July 2016. India's Central Board of Film Certification (CBFC) gave the film an A certificate, an adults-only rating restriction, based on the film's horror content and violence. The filmmakers made cuts to the film and attempted to have the film recertified, but the censor board did not change the rating.

In mid March 2017, Sridhar, a television screenwriter, accused Doss Ramasamy of plagiarising his script Alibabavum Arputha Carum, and threatened to take legal action against the makers of the film. Doss subsequently filed a complaint at the South Indian Film Writers Association. After reading both the scripts, the association declared that Dora was an original script and not a plagiarised one.

Release
The satellite rights of the film were sold to Zee Tamizh.

Soundtrack

The film's music was composed by duo Vivek–Mervin, in their third film venture following Vadacurry (2014) and Pugazh (2016). The soundtrack was released on 8 February 2017 through Sony Music. Later, the soundtrack for the Telugu dubbed version was also released in March 2017.

Critical reception
Indiaglitz called it "a decent spirit revenge thriller" that "gets it right in parts" and rated it a 2.5/5. Thinkal Menon from The Times of India gave it a 2.5/5 saying that it was "let down by the predictable screenplay and weak scenes that have enough loopholes".  Anupama Subramanian from Deccan Chronicle gave it a 2.5/5 and said that while "Nayanthara's terrific screen presence rules the film", "there are very little spooky moments".  Behindwoods claimed that "Nayanthara and the car manage to save a cliched horror-revenge saga, to an extent!" and rated it 2.25/5.  Srivastan from India Today gave it a 2/5 and said that it had "no memorable moment to ponder on after a tedious watch".  Karthik Kumar from Hindustan Times said that "this Nayanthara film drowns in its own mediocrity" and rated it 1/5.

In contrast, a critic Baradwaj Rangan from Film Companion rated it 3.5/5, calling it "a surprisingly well-written (and emotionally solid) horror film whose heroine kicks real ass".

References

External links

2017 films
2017 horror films
2010s supernatural horror films
2017 horror thriller films
2010s Tamil-language films
Indian supernatural horror films
Indian supernatural thriller films
Indian horror thriller films
Films about automobiles
Films involved in plagiarism controversies
Indian films about revenge
2017 directorial debut films